Sapromyza quadripunctata is a species of fly in the family Lauxaniidae. It is found in the  Palearctic .

References

Lauxaniidae
Insects described in 1767
Muscomorph flies of Europe
Taxa named by Carl Linnaeus